The 16th GS Caltex Cup began in January 2011. Won Seong-jin, the defending champion, was knocked out in the first round.

Tournament

References

2011 in go
Go competitions in South Korea